Brigantia or Brigindo was a goddess in Celtic (Gallo-Roman and Romano-British) religion of Late Antiquity.

Through interpretatio Romana, she was identified with the goddesses Minerva, Tyche/Fortuna, and Victoria. The tales connected to the characters of Brigid and Saint Brigid in Irish mythology and legend have been argued to be connected to Brigantia, although the figures themselves remain distinct.

Etymology

The name is derived from Proto-Celtic *brigantī and means "The High One", cognate with the Old Irish name Brigit, the Old High German personal name Burgunt, the Sanskrit word Bṛhatī (बृहती) "high", an epithet of the Hindu dawn goddess Ushas, and Avestan bǝrǝzaitī. The ultimate source is Proto-Indo-European *bʰr̥ǵʰéntih₂ (feminine form of *bʰérǵʰonts, "high"), derived from the root *bʰerǵʰ- ("to rise").

Evidence for Brigantia
This goddess appears in several locations across the Celtic world, sometimes likened to Brigindo in Gaul or Brigit in Ireland or Great Britain.

Inscriptions

Currently, there are eight known inscriptions to Brigantia in Britain. At Birrens (the Roman Blatobulgium), Dumfries and Galloway, in Scotland, is an inscription:
Brigantiae s(acrum) Amandus / arc(h)itectus ex imperio imp(eratum) (fecit)

Two inscriptions associate Brigantia with the Roman goddess Victoria, one from Castleford in Yorkshire and one from Greetland near Halifax, also in Yorkshire. The later may be dated to 208 CE by mention of the consuls:
D(eae) Vict(oriae) Brig(antiae) / et num(inibus) Aauugg(ustorum) / T(itus) Aur(elius) Aurelian/us d(onum) d(edit) pro se / et suis s(e) mag(istro) s(acrorum) // Antonin[o] / III et Geta [II] / co(n)ss(ulibus)
In Adel, an altar was found before 1816 with the inscription Deae Brigantiae Donum Cinge/ Tissa Posuit. 

At Corbridge on Hadrians Wall – in antiquity, Coria – Brigantia has the divine epithet Caelestis ("Heavenly, Celestial") and is paired with Jupiter Dolichenus, a Roman god popular with members of the Roman army.:
Iovi aeterno / Dolicheno / et caelesti / Brigantiae / et Saluti / C(aius) Iulius Ap/ol(l)inaris / |(centurio) leg(ionis) VI iuss(u) dei

There is an inscription at Irthington near Brampton in Cumbria DEAE NYMPHAE BRIGANTIAE—"to the divine nymph Brigantia".

There are two inscriptions referring to Dia Brigantiae (the goddess Brigantiae).

There is one inscription to "Tutela Brigantia Augusta".

Garret Olmstead noted numismatic legends in Iberian script, BRIGANT_N (or PRIKANT_N, as Iberic script does not distinguish voiced and unvoiced consonants) inscribed on a Celtiberian coin, suggesting a cognate Celtiberian goddess.

Iconography
At Birrens (the Roman Blatobulgium), archaeologists have found a Roman-era stone bas-relief of a female figure; she is crowned like a tutelary deity, has a Gorgon's head on her breast, and holds a spear and a globe of victory like the Roman goddesses Victoria and Minerva. The inscription mentioned above assures the identification of the statue as Brigantia rather than Minerva. A statue found in Brittany also seems to depict Brigantia with the attributes of Minerva.

Toponymy
There are several placenames deriving from 'Brigantium', the neuter form of the same adjective of which the feminine became the name of the goddess. Association of these with the goddess is however dubious, since the placenames are easily explained as referring to a "high fort" or "high place" in the literal sense.

Lisa Bitel noted a wide spread through toponymy: 

Other towns which may also preserve this theonym include Brigetio in Hungary and also Briançonnet and Briançon, both in Provence-Alpes-Côte d'Azur, France. In antiquity, Briançon was called Brigantio and was the first town on the Via Domitia. It is attested by an inscriptions mentioning munic(ipii) Brigantien(sium) (the town of Brigantio) and Bri/gantione geniti (the Briganti people). At Briançonnet, two third-century inscriptions mention ord(o) Brig(antorum). There, oak trees were particularly venerated.

The ancient name of Bragança in Trás-os-Montes, Portugal, was Brigantia. The inhabitants today are still called brigantinos. Braga is another town in Portugal. It is the capital of the district of the same name in the province of Minho. A short distance up the coast, the cities of A Coruña and Betanzos in present-day Galicia (which together with the area of present-day Portugal north of the Douro river formed the Roman and later medieval kingdom of Gallaecia or Callaecia) were respectively named Brigantia and Brigantium. According to the Lebor Gabála Érenn (The Book of the Takings of Ireland), Breogán founded the city called Brigantia and built a tower there from the top of which his son Íth glimpses Ireland and then sets sail across the Celtic Sea to invade and settle it.

References

Bibliography
 Année Epigraphique (AE), yearly volumes.
 
 Claus, Manfred; Epigraphik-Datenbank  Clauss / Slaby, Johann Wolfgang Goethe-Universität Frankfurt. Online epigraphic search tool
 
 
 
 
 
Roman Inscriptions of Britain (RIB).

See also
 Brigantes, Celtic tribe associated with Northern England
 Isurium Brigantum
 Breton language
 Breton people

External links

Brighid: What Do We Really Know? by Francine Nicholson includes a section on Brigantia and a picture of the Birrens bas-relief.

Goddesses of the ancient Britons
Gaulish goddesses
War goddesses
Tutelary deities
Celtic goddesses

it:Brigid#Brigantia